Matías Galarza Fonda (born 11 February 2002) is a Paraguayan professional footballer who plays as a midfielder for Vasco da Gama.

Club career
Born in Asunción, Galarza represented hometown side Olimpia. On 19 June 2020, he moved on loan to Brazilian club Vasco da Gama until 2022, and was initially assigned to the under-20 squad.

After impressing with the under-20s, Galarza made his senior debut on 3 March 2021, after coming on as a half-time substitute for Vinícius in a 0–1 Campeonato Carioca home loss against Portuguesa; at the age of 19, he became the youngest foreigner to play for Vasco in the 21st century. He scored his first goal as a professional on 24 March, netting his team's third in a 3–1 home success over Macaé.

On 20 May 2021, Galarza signed a permanent contract with Vasco until 2025, after the club bought 60% of his economic rights for a fee of US$ 500,000. A regular starter during the remainder of the campaign, he lost his starting spot in 2022.

On 4 April 2022, Galarza moved to Série A side Coritiba on loan for the remainder of the year.

Career statistics

References

External links
 
 Vasco profile 

2002 births
Living people
Sportspeople from Asunción
Paraguayan footballers
Association football midfielders
CR Vasco da Gama players
Coritiba Foot Ball Club players
Campeonato Brasileiro Série A players
Campeonato Brasileiro Série B players
Paraguay youth international footballers
Paraguay international footballers
Paraguayan expatriate footballers
Paraguayan expatriate sportspeople in Brazil
Expatriate footballers in Brazil